Schjøll is a Norwegian surname. Notable people with the surname include:

Anita Schjøll Brede (born 1985), Norwegian entrepreneur
Agnes Victoria (Lila) Schjøll (1881–1926), wife of Wilhelm Schencke

Norwegian-language surnames